The primary languages of Palestine are Arabic and Hebrew.

Overview
Palestinian Arabic is the primary language spoken by Palestinians and has a unique dialect. A Levantine Arabic dialect subgroup, it is spoken in Palestine by Palestinians and in Palestinian populations in the West Bank, Gaza, elsewhere within the Occupied Territories, and in the diaspora around the world. However, Palestinian refugees in other parts of the world may have a different dialect from Palestinian Arabic. In the West Bank, there are many Israeli settlements in which, since the early 20th century, Hebrew has become more common. However, Russian and Amharic has also started to appear resulting from Aliyah (Jewish migration) from Ethiopia. Other Jewish migrants have also brought other European languages.

In premodern and medieval time periods, many other languages had also been spoken in Palestine for ceremonial purposes or otherwise, including Latin and other Italic languages as well as French, Germanic languages, Classical Arabic and Greek. However, they gradually faded away along with geopolitical shifts and the end of feudalism.

See also
Demographics of the Palestinian territories

References